The following is a list of Second World War military vehicles organized by country, showing numbers produced in parentheses.

Afghanistan

Tanks 
 L3/35 (14)
 Disston Tractor Tank (2)
 FT-17 (20)

Argentina

Tanks 
 Nahuel DL 43 (16)
 Fiat 3000 (1)
 Vickers Cardon-Loyd Model 1934 (12)

Utility vehicles 
 Ñandú (5)

Australia

Tanks 
 Sentinel (65)
 Thunderbolt (1)
 AC4 (1)

Armoured car 
 Dingo (245)
 Rhino (3)
 Rover (238)

Belgium

Tanks 
 ACG-1 (12)
 T-13 (199)
 T-15 (42)
 Renault FT (75 in storage)

Utility vehicles 
 FN Tricar (331 ordered & partially delivered)

Bulgaria

Tankettes 
 L3/33 (14)

Tanks 
 Vickers Mk E (8)
 Renault R35 (39)
 SOMUA S35 (6)
 Hotchkiss H35 (19)
 Panzer 35(t) (36)
 Panzer 38(t) (10)
 Panzer I (1)
 Panzer IV (46 or 91)
 T-34 (85)
 PzKpfw IV H with 76,2mm ZiS-3 Gun Bulgarian modified Panzer IV

Self-propelled guns

Tank-based 
 Semovente da 47/32 (2)
 Jagdpanzer IV
 Sturmgeschütz III (55 ordered, 25 delivered)
 Sturmgeschütz IV

Armored cars 
 Leichter Panzerspähwagen (20)
 Sd.Kfz.232 Schwerer Panzerspähwagen

Utility vehicles 
 Fiat 626 (100)
 Ursus A
 Pavesi P4
 TL.37
 Stoewer R200 Spezial 40 (10)

Canada

Tanks 
 M3 Stuart (432) light tank used by America and Canada
 Ram (2,993) Regular tank not used in combat, specialist models used
 Grizzly I (188) A modified version of the M4A1 Sherman tank license produced in Canada
 Valentine (1,420) Valentine tanks produced in Canada. Most sent to the Soviet Union as Lend-Lease aid. Some were retained in Canada for training.
 Badger – a flame tank version of the Ram

Self-propelled artillery 
 Sexton (2,150)

Armoured personnel carriers 
 C15TA  (3,960)
 Kangaroo (converted from various AFV designs)

Armoured car 
 Lynx (3,255)
 Otter (1,761)
 Fox (1,506)

Utility vehicles
 Ford F15 (400,000)

China

Tankettes 
 Carden Loyd tankette Mk VI (53)
 L3/33 (Bought from Italy before the war)
 L3/35 (Bought from Italy before the war)

Tanks 
 Renault FT (most of delivered 36 tanks, 3 tanks captured by Japanese in 1931)
 M4 Sherman (35 tanks, only used in India-Burma Theater by Chinese Expedition Army)
 M3 Stuart (M3A3, M5A1) (50 tanks, only used in India-Burma Theater by Chinese Expedition Army)
 M24 Chaffee – 233
 M18 Hellcat
 Type 95 Ha-Go (Captured only)
 Type 97 Chi-Ha (Captured only)
 Panzer I (10 Bought from Germany before the war)
 Vickers 6-ton (20 Bought from UK before the war)
 Vickers amphibious tank M1931 (29 tanks purchased from GB)
 British 12-ton tank (type unclear - likely Vickers Medium Mark II, possibly Cruiser Mk I, or remotely Matilda I)
 T26 (88 provided by Soviets in 1938)
 BT-5 (4 provided by Soviets in 1938)
 Marmon-Herrington CTLS (few diverted from Dutch after the fall of Java)
 AMR 35
 T-34 (Supplied from Russia)

Armored cars 
 Dowa licence produced Model 25 Vickers Crossley Armored Car
 GMC M1931 (Chinese copy)
 Leichter Panzerspähwagen (Sd.Kfz. 221 and Sd.Kfz. 222) – 12 bought from Germany
 BA-10 and BA-20 – about 50
 Renault UE Chenillette about 10
 M8 Light Armor Car

Czechoslovakia

Tanks
 LT vz. 35 (434)
 LT vz. 38 (1,167)

Tankettes
 Tančík vz. 33 (70)
 AH-IV (206)

Armoured cars
 OA vz. 27 (15)
 OA vz. 30 (51)

Denmark
 Armoured Harley Davidson motorcycle (trials)
 Fiat 3000 (1)
 FP-4 and FP-5
 Landsverk L-180 (2)
 Landsverk L-185 (1, used for training)
 Pansarbil m/39 (3)
 PV-10 (5)
 V3 "Holger Danske" armored car (Made on a Ford FAA)

Finland

Tanks
 Renault FT (used only as in place fire position)
 Vickers Mark E (26) (Modified, equipped with 37 mm Puteaux SA-18 or with 37mm Bofors)
 BT-5 and BT-7 (captured)
 T-26 (captured)
 T-28 (captured)
 T-34 (captured)
 KV-1 (captured)
 Panzer IV (bought)

Anti-Aircraft
 Landsverk L-62 Anti II (6)

Assault guns
 BT-42 (18)
 Sturmgeschütz III (59)

France

Tanks

Armoured reconnaissance tanks
 AMR 33 (123)
 AMR 35 (200)

Armoured combat tanks
 AMC 34 (12)
 AMC 35 (57)

Light tanks
 Renault R35 (1,601)
 Hotchkiss H35 (1,100) - Hotchkiss H35 or modified version H39.
 FCM 36 (100)
 Char D1 (160)
 Renault R40 (130)
 Renault FT (1,580) - World War I era tank.
 AMX 38 - trials.

Medium tanks
 Somua S-35 (430)
 Char D2 (100)

Heavy tanks
 Char B1 (405)
 FCM 2C (10)
 FCM F1 (1 wooden mock-up)

Tank destroyers
 Laffly W15 TCC (70)
 AMR 35 Renault ZT2 (10)
 AMR 35 Renault ZT3 (10)
 Somua S40 (trials)

Self propelled guns
 Canon de 194 mle GPF (50)
 Renault FT BS (39)
 105 leFH18B2 (16)

Armoured personnel carriers
 Renault UE (5,168)
 Lorraine 37L (630)

Armored cars
 Panhard 178 (941)
 AMC Schneider P 16 (100)

Germany

Tanks

Light tanks
 Panzer I (1,659, excluding conversions)
 Panzer II (1,856, excluding conversions)
 Panzer 35(t) (Czechoslovakian design, 434)
 Panzer 38(t) (Czechoslovakian design, 1,168 total)
 Kampfpanzer 7TP(p) (7TP captured during Germany's invasion of Poland)
 Pz.Kpfw. 17/18 R(f) (Renault FT captured following the Battle of France)
 Pz.Kpfw. 35R(f) (Renault R35 captured following the Battle of France) (~800)
 Pz.Kpfw. 35/38/39 H(f) (Hotchkiss H35 captured following the Battle of France)
 Pz.Kpfw. T-26(r) (Captured T-26)

Medium tanks
 Panzer III (5,774, excluding StuG III)
 Panzer IV (8,553)
 Panzer V "Panther" (5,984)

Heavy tanks
 VK 4501 (P) (91, one used as command tank, most of the others converted to Elefant tank destroyers)
 Tiger I (1,347)
 Tiger II a.k.a. "King Tiger" or "Royal Tiger" (489)

Super-Heavy tanks 

 Maus (2 prototypes completed)

Armoured cars 
 Panzerjäger Bren 731(e) (Universal Carrier captured by the Germans and fitted with a triple Panzerschreck mount)
 Fahrgestell Bren (Universal Carrier reused by the Germans with a 3.7 cm PaK 36 gun)
 Sd.Kfz. 221 Leichter Panzerspähwagen Light armoured car
 Sd.Kfz. 222 Leichter Panzerspähwagen Light armoured car
 Sd.Kfz. 223 Leichter Panzerspähwagen Light armoured car
 Sd.Kfz. 231 Schwere Panzerspähwagen (6-Rad) Heavy armoured car
 Sd.Kfz. 232 Schwere Panzerspähwagen (8-Rad) Heavy armoured car
 Sd.Kfz. 233 Schwere Panzerspähwagen (8-Rad) Heavy armoured car
 Sd.Kfz. 234/1 Schwere Panzerspähwagen (8-Rad) Heavy armoured car
 Sd.Kfz. 234/2 Schwere Panzerspähwagen (8-Rad) Puma Heavy armoured car
 Sd.Kfz. 234/3 Schwere Panzerspähwagen (8-Rad) Stummel Heavy armoured car
 Sd.Kfz. 234/4 Schwere Panzerspähwagen (8-Rad) Heavy armoured car
 Sd.Kfz. 2348 wheeled armored car (also known as Puma or Stummel)
 Steyr ADGZ Heavy Armoured Car (from Austrian annex)
 Panzerspähwagen P204(f) (Panhard 178 captured following the Battle of France)
 Panzerspähwagen BA-10(r) (Captured BA-10)
 Panzerspähwagen AB43 203(i) (Captured after Italian armistice)

Utility vehicles 
 Mercedes-Benz L3000 truck (27,700) was the most bought in 1944
 Opel Blitz truck
 Raupenschlepper, Ost tracked truck
 Steyr 1500A light truck
 Horch 108 Heavy off-road passenger car, Einheits-PKW der Wehrmacht
 Volkswagen Kübelwagen 4-piston multipurpose all-terrain support vehicle (50,435)
 Volkswagen Schwimmwagen amphibious variant of the Kübelwagen (14,265)
 Volkswagen Type 82E 4-piston squad car/personal command car

Motorcycles 
 BMW R75 (two wheel drive motorcycle with side car)
 Nimbus (made in Denmark)
 Zündapp KS750 (two wheel drive motorcycle with side car) (18,000)

Half-tracks 
 Maultier (22,500)
 Schwerer Wehrmachtschlepper (825)
 Sd.Kfz. 2 "Kettenkrad" (8,345)
 Sd.Kfz. 3 (21,020)
 Sd.Kfz. 4 (1,480)
 Sd.Kfz. 6 (3,660)
 Sd.Kfz. 7 (12,187)
 Sd.Kfz. 10 (14,000)
 Sd.Kfz. 11 (app. 9000)
 Sd.Kfz. 250 (6,628)
 Sd.Kfz. 251 "Hanomag" (15,252)
 Sd.Kfz 252 (413)
 Sd.Kfz 253 (285)
 Sd.Kfz 254 (140)

Self-propelled artillery
 8 cm Raketen-Vielfachwerfer
 Sd.Kfz. 165 Hummel (100+)
 Sd.Kfz. 138/1 Grille I/II (389)
 Sd.Kfz. 124 Wespe (676)
 Sd.Kfz. 4/1 15 cm Panzerwerfer 42 auf Selbstfahrlafette "Maultier" (300)
 Karl-Gerät 60 cm 24 a/k/a "Mörser Karl" (7)
 Schwerer Gustav (2 built)

Assault guns
 Sd.Kfz. 142 Sturmgeschütz III (StuG III) (10,086)
 Sturmhaubitze 42 (1,299)
 Sturm-Infanteriegeschütz 33B (24)
 Sd.Kfz. 166 Brummbär (306)
 Sd.Kfz. 167 Sturmgeschütz IV (StuG IV) (1,108+31 conversions)
 Sturmtiger (18)
 10.5 cm K gepanzerte Selbstfahrlafette "Dicker Max" (2 prototypes)
 12.8 cm Selbstfahrlafette auf VK 30.01(H) "Sturer Emil" (2 prototypes)
 15 cm sIG 33 (Sf) auf Panzerkampfwagen I Ausf B (38)
 15 cm sIG 33 auf Fahrgestell Panzerkampfwagen II (Sf) (12)

Tank destroyers
 Panzerjäger I (202)
 Sd.Kfz. 132 Marder I (170)
 Sd.Kfz. 131 Marder II (576)
 Sd.Kfz. 138 Marder III (1,561, all types)
 Sd.Kfz. 138/2 Jagdpanzer 38(t) "Hetzer" (2,827)
 Sd.Kfz. 162 Jagdpanzer IV (1,977)
 Sd.Kfz. 164 Nashorn (494)
 Sd.Kfz. 173 Jagdpanzer V "Jagdpanther" (415)
 Sd.Kfz. 184 Panzerjäger Tiger (P) Elefant (91)
 Sd.Kfz. 186 Jagdpanzer VI "Jagdtiger" (88)

Self-propelled anti-aircraft guns
 Sd.Kfz. 7/1 2 cm FlaKvierling 38 L/112.5 (319) - quadruple 2 cm gun on a half track chassis
 Sd.Kfz. 7/2 3.7 cm FlaK 37 L/98 (123) - 3.7 cm gun on half track chassis
 Sd.Kfz. 10/4 and Sd.Kfz. 10/5 (~2,000) - 2 cm gun on a half track chassis
 Flakpanzer 38(t) (141)
 Flakpanzer IV "Möbelwagen" (~300) - Sd.Kfz. 161/3, a 3.7 cm gun on Panzer IV chassis
 Flakpanzer IV "Wirbelwind" (87-105) - Sd.Kfz. 161/4, quadruple 2 cm Flak on Panzer IV chassis
 Flakpanzer I (24) - 2 cm Flak 38 on a Panzer I chassis
 Flakpanzer IV "Ostwind" (43–45) - turreted 3.7 cm gun on Panzer IV chassis
 Flakpanzer IV "Kugelblitz" (5 prototypes)
 3.7 cm Flakzwilling auf Panther Fahrgestell (only a wooden mock-up was built)

Remote controlled vehicles
 Borgward B IV demolition vehicle (1,181)
 Goliath tracked mine (7,564)
 Springer demolition vehicle (50)

Hungary

Tanks

Light tanks 
 Toldi I, II, IIa, and III (202)
 Straussler V-4 (4+ prototypes)
 T-38 (Panzer 38(t), Czechoslovakian design, 105-111)
 35M and 37M Tankettes (modified L3/33 and L3/35, 60-150)

Medium tanks 

 Turán I and II (424)
 43M Turán III (2 prototypes)
 Panzer III
 Panzer IV (74+)
 Panzer V "Panther" (5-17)

Heavy tanks 

 44M Tas (2 prototypes)
 Tiger I (13-15)

Captured tanks 

 BT-7 (captured)
 Hotchkiss H39 (15 captured vehicles provided by Germany)
 LT vz. 34 (captured)
 LT vz. 35 (captured)
 M3 Stuart (captured)
 SOMUA S35 (2 captured vehicles provided by Germany)
 T-26 (captured)
 T-28 (captured)
 T-34 (including T-34/76 and T-34/85) (captured)

Self-propelled guns
 43M Zrínyi II (72)
 Sturmgeschütz III G (StuG III G) (50)

Tank destroyers 

 44M Zrínyi I (1 prototype)
 43M Toldi páncélvadász (1 prototype)
 Marder II (5-7)
 Jagdpanzer 38(t) "Hetzer" (75-101)

Self-propelled anti-aircraft guns
 40M Nimród (135)

Armoured cars 
 39M Csaba (102-145)

Utility vehicles
 38M Botond (2,554)
 37M (Sd.Kfz. 11, 74)
 43M Lehel (Hu) (APC/medical vehicle based on the Nimród chassis, 1-4 prototypes)

India

Armoured cars 
 Armoured Carrier Wheeled Indian Pattern (4,655)

Italy

Tankettes 
 Carro Veloce L3/33 (CV-33) (760)
 Carro Veloce L3/35 (CV-35) (1,740)

Tanks

Light tanks 
 Fiat 3000 (152~200)
 Carro Armato L6/40 (283)

Medium tanks 
 Carro Armato M11/39 (100)
 Carro Armato M13/40 (740)
 Carro Armato M14/41 (800~939)
 Carro Armato M15/42 (82~282)
 Carro Armato Celere Sahariano M16/43 (only prototype)

Heavy tanks 
 Carro Pesante P26/40 (101~103)

Tank destroyers and Self-propelled guns 
 Semovente M40 47/32 (282~300)
 Semovente M41 75/18 (262~467)
 Semovente da 75/34 (141~182)
 Semovente M43 75/46 (11~13)
 Semovente M41 90/53 (30~48)
 Semovente M42L 105/25 (121)
 Semovente da 149/40 (only prototype)
 Semovente da 20/70 quadruplo (only prototype)

Armoured cars 
 Autoblindo 40 (24)
 Autoblindo 41 (647)
 Autoblindo Lince (250)
 Autoblindo 43 (70) (All were captured and used by the German Army)

Utility vehicles 
 SPA-Viberti AS.42
 Alfa Romeo 430 truck
 Alfa Romeo 500 truck
 Alfa Romeo 800 heavy truck
 Breda 61 half-track (250, licensed copy of Sd.Kfz. 7)

Japan

Tankettes
 Type 92 cavalry tank (167)
 Type 94 tankette (823)
 Type 97 Te-Ke (616)

Tanks

Light tanks
 Type 95 Ha-Go (2,300)
 Type 98 Ke-Ni (104)
 Type 2 Ke-To (34)
 Type 4 Ke-Nu (100)
 Type 5 Ke-Ho (1 prototype)

Medium tanks
 Type 89 Chi-Ro (404)
 Type 97 Chi-Ha (1,162)
 Type 98 Chi-Ho (4 prototypes)
 Type 97-Kai Shinhoto Chi-Ha (930)
 Type 1 Chi-He (170)
 Type 3 Chi-Nu (144 to 166)
 Type 4 Chi-To (2)
 Type 5 Chi-Ri (1 incomplete prototype)

Heavy tanks
 Type 91 heavy tank (1 prototype)
 Type 95 heavy tank (4 prototypes)

Amphibious tanks 
 Type 2 Ka-Mi (182 to 184)
 Type 3 Ka-Chi (19)
 Type 5 To-Ku (1 prototype)

Self-propelled guns
 Type 1 75 mm SPH Ho-Ni I (26)
 Type 1 105 mm SPH Ho-Ni II (54)
 Type 2 gun tank Ho-I (31)
 Type 3 gun tank Ho-Ni III (31)
 Type 4 150 mm SPH Ho-Ro (12)
 Type 4 120 mm SPH Ho-To (1 prototype)
 Type 5 47 mm SPG Ho-Ru (1 prototype)
 Short Barrel 120 mm gun tank (12)
 Naval 12 cm SPG (1 prototype)

Armoured personnel carriers
 Type 1 Ho-Ha (unknown)
 Type 1 Ho-Ki (limited)
 Type 4 Chi-So (2)
 Type 4 Ka-Tsu armoured tracked amphibious carrier (49)

Armoured cars 
 Vickers Crossley armoured car (12)
 Chiyoda armored car (200)
 Sumida M.2593 (1,000)
 Type 93 armoured car (limited)

Netherlands

Tankettes
 Carden-Loyd Mark IV (5)
 Marmon-Herrington CTLS (20)

Light Tank
 Renault FT (1)

Armoured cars
 Landsverk L180 (14)
 Landsverk L181 (12)
 M39 Pantserwagen (12)

New Zealand

Converted tractors
 Bob Semple tank (4)

Light tanks
 Light Tank, Wheel-and-Track (Schofield) wheel/caterpillar fast tank, prototype only
Also American M3 Stuart Tanks, called "Honeys" by the Brits and Commonwealth, used in Italy as recon vehicles

Armoured personnel carriers 
 Universal carrier (1,300)

Armoured cars 
 Beaverette NZ (208) light armoured car similar to the British Beaverette

Norway

Light tanks
 Stridsvagn L-120 (1)

Poland

Tankettes
 TK-3 (280)
 TKS (260)
 TKS with 20 mm gun (24)

Tanks
 4TP
 7TP (162)
 9TP (2 prototypes + 11 possible production models)
 10TP (1 prototype)
 14TP

Armored cars
 Samochód pancerny wz. 28
 Samochód pancerny wz. 29 (10-13)
 Samochód pancerny wz. 34 (87)
 Kubuś (1, used by the Polish Home Army)

Self-propelled guns
 TKS-D (2)
 TKD (4)

Artillery tractors
 C2P (200)
 C4P
 C7P (151)
 PZInż 302

Utility vehicles
 Fiat 508 łazik
 Fiat 508/518
 Fiat 518
 Fiat 618
 Fiat 621
 Ursus A

Romania

Tankettes 

 R-1 (Modified Czechoslovak AH-IV, 1 prototype + 35 imported from Czechoslovakia)

Tanks
 R-2 (Panzer 35(t), Czechoslovakian design, 126 + 26 Panzer 35(t))

Tank destroyers 
 Mareşal (7 prototypes + early serial production)
 TACAM T-60 (Soviet T-60 converted into a tank destroyer with a different Soviet gun, 34)
 TACAM R-2 (Czechoslovak Panzer 35(t) converted into a tank destroyer with a Soviet gun, 21)
 Vânătorul de care R35 (R35 with different gun, French design, 30)

Armoured cars
 AB md. 41 (1 prototype)
 Sd. Kfz. 222 (46)
 Sd. Kfz. 223 (35)
 AB-41 (8)
 Peugeot Armored Car (2)
 Austin-Putilov (4)
 OA vz. 30 (10)
 OA vz. 27 (3)
 BA-10 & BA-64 (103+)

Artillery tractors
 Malaxa UE (Renault UE Chenillette, French design, 126)
 T-1 tractor (5 prototypes)

Demolition vehicles
 Romanian Goliath (1 prototype)

South Africa

Armoured cars
 Marmon-Herrington Armoured Car (5,746)

Soviet Union

Source: Zaloga (1984:125, 225).

Tankettes 
 T-27 (3,328 pre-war)

Tanks

Light tanks
 T-18
 T-26 (11,218 pre-war)
 T-37A, T-38 & T-40, amphibious tanks
 T-50 (65)
 T-60 (5,839)
 T-70 (8,226)
 T-80 & T-90 (75)
 BT tanks (8,060 pre-war, including BT-2, BT-5 and BT-7)

Medium tanks
 T-28 (503 pre-war)
 T-34 (1,225 pre-war)
 T-34-76 (33,805)
 T-34-85 (21,048)
 T-44

Heavy tanks
 T-35 (61 pre-war)
 SMK (experimental)
 KV (Kliment Voroshilov)  (508 pre-war)
 KV-1 (Kliment Voroshilov 1) (3,015)
 KV-1S (Kliment Voroshilov 1S) (1,232)
 KV-85 (Kliment Voroshilov 85) (130)
 KV-2 (Kliment Voroshilov 2) (334)
 IS-1 heavy tank IS-1 (Iosif Stalin 1)
 IS-2 heavy tank IS-2 (Iosif Stalin 2) (3,590)
 IS-3 heavy tank IS-3 (Iosef Stalin 3) (2,311 including 29 till the end of the war)

Self-propelled guns 
 ZiS-30 (101)
 SU-5
 SU-14 super heavy SPG (2 prototypes, both took part in indirect fire against the Germans in Kubinka)
 SU-76 (14,292)
 SU-85 tank destroyer (2,644)
 SU-100 tank destroyer (2,495)
 SU-122 self-propelled howitzer  (638)
 SU-152 (671)
 ISU-122/ISU-152 (4,635)
 SU-26 (12 or 14)
 Object 704 tank destroyer
 ISU-152 tank destroyer

Rocket artillery 
 Katyusha (10,000)

Anti-aircraft 
 M-4 GAZ AA motorized quad Russian M1910 Maxim guns
 ZiS-42 motorized 25 mm
 YaG-10 motorized 76.2 mm
 T-90 anti-aircraft tank (dual 12.7 mm DShK)
 ZSU-25 dual 25 mm
 ZSU-37 37 mm

Armoured cars 
 D-8
 FAI (636 pre-war)
 BA-20 (2,013)
 LB-23
 BA-64 (8,174)
 BA-27
 BA-I
 BA-3 (554 pre-war)
 BA-6
 BA-10 (3,311)
 LB-62
 BA-11 (18)

Amphibious armoured cars
 PB-4
 PB-7
 BAD-2

Half-tracks 
 BA-30

Aerosans 
 ANT-IV
 NKL-16
 NKL-26
 RF-8
 ASD-400

Artillery tractors 
 Komsomolets (4,041 pre-war)
 T-26-T
 STZ-3 (3,658 pre-war)
 STZ-5 (7,170 pre-war)
 Komintern (1,017 pre-war)
 Voroshilovets (228 pre-war)
 Kommunar (504 pre-war)
 YA-12 (1,666)

Improvised AFVs 
 KhTZ-16 (~90)
 IZ (>5)
 NI tank (~69)

Utility vehicles

Motorcycles
 PMZ-A-750
 M-72

Light utility vehicles
 GAZ-64
 GAZ-67

Trucks
 GAZ-AA
 GAZ-AAA
 GAZ-MM
 ZIS-5

Thailand

Tanks and Tankettes
 Carden Loyd tankette (~60)
 Type 83 (50)
 Vickers 6-Ton (30)

Self-propelled guns

Anti-aircraft 
 Type 76 SPAAG (26)

United Kingdom

Artillery tractors
 AEC Matador  (9,000)
 Albion CX22S 
 Dragon Mark IV
 Crusader II, Gun Tractor Mk I
 Guy Quad
 Morris C8 Quad FAT (10,000)
 Scammell Pioneer R100  (768)

Tanks

Light tanks
 Tank, Light, Mk.II (36)
 Tank, Light, Mk.III
 Tank, Light, Mk.IV
 Tank, Light, Mk.V (22)
 Tank, Light, Mk.VI (1,320)
 Tank, Light, Mk. VII Tetrarch (177)
 Tank, Light, Mk. VIII "Harry Hopkins" (A25) (100)
 Vickers 6 Ton Type B (1,939) - 4 used for training

Medium tanks
 Tank, Medium, Mk.II
 Sherman Firefly (~2,000) - modification of M4 Sherman.
 M3 Grant - US M3 Medium built to UK specification bought from the Americans
 M4 Sherman

Heavy tanks
 Tank, Heavy, TOG I (1 prototype)
 Tank, Heavy, TOG II (1 prototype)
 Tank, Heavy Assault, A33 (Excelsior) (only prototypes, not mass-produced or accepted into service)
 Tank, Heavy Assault, Tortoise (A39) (6 prototypes - finished in late 1945 after end of war)
 Tank, Infantry, Churchill (A22) (7,368)

Cruiser tanks
 Tank, Cruiser, Mk.I (A9) (125)
 Tank, Cruiser, Mk. II (A10) (205)
 Tank, Cruiser, Mk. III (A13) (65)
 Tank, Cruiser, Mk. IV (A13 Mk.II) (655)
 Tank, Cruiser, Mk.V, Covenanter (A13 Mk.III) (1,771)
 Tank, Cruiser, Mk.VI, Crusader (A15) (5,700)
 Tank, Cruiser, Mk.VII, Cavalier (A24) (500)
 Tank, Cruiser, Mk.VIII, Centaur (A27L) (950)
 Tank, Cruiser, Mk.VIII, Cromwell (A27M) (4,200)
 Tank, Cruiser, Challenger (A30) (296)
 Tank, Cruiser, Comet I (A34) (United Kingdom) (1,200)
 Tank, Cruiser, Centurion I (A41) - Not used in WWII)

Infantry tanks
 Tank, Infantry, Mk.I, Matilda I (A11) (140)
 Tank, Infantry, Tank Mk.II, Matilda II (A12) (2,987)
 Tank, Infantry, Mk.III, Valentine (8,275)
 Tank, Infantry, Mk.IV, Churchill (A22) (5,460)
 Tank, Infantry, Valiant (A38) (1 prototype)
 Tank, Infantry, Black Prince (A43) (6 prototypes)

Self-propelled guns
 Carrier, Valentine, 25pdr gun Mk.I, Bishop (80)
 AEC Mk I Gun Carrier (175)
 25pdr SP, tracked, Sexton (2,150; built in Canada)
 SP 17pdr, Valentine, Mk.I, Archer (655)
 SP 17pdr, A30 Avenger (250 completed post war)
 17pdr SP Achilles (1,100)

Armoured personnel carriers
 Universal carrier (84,120)
 Loyd Carrier (26,000)
 M7 Kangaroo (armoured personnel carrier)
 Terrapin (200), an amphibious vehicle

Armoured cars
 AEC Armoured Car (629)
 Daimler Armoured Car (2,694)
 Daimler Scout Car (Dingo) (6,626)
 Guy Armoured Car (101)
 Humber Armoured Car (5,400)
 Humber Light Reconnaissance Car (over 3,600)
 Humber Scout Car (at least 4,102)
 Lanchester Armoured Car (35)
 Lynx Canadian version of Daimler Dingo
 Morris Light Reconnaissance Car (over 2,200)
 Morris CS9 (100)
 Rolls-Royce Armoured Car (76 in service at the start of the war)
 Standard Beaverette (~2,800)
 Staghound Armoured Car US built (~4,000)

Lorries
NB: In British nomenclature, a vehicle with load-carrying capacity of less than one imperial ton (20 hundredweight) was designated as a truck.
 AEC Armoured Command Vehicle (415)
 Albion WD.CX24 Tank Transporter
 Austin K2/Y Ambulance. (13,102)
 Austin K3
 Austin K4
 Austin K4 Dropside
 Austin K5
 Austin K6 GS
 Austin K6 Gantry
 Bedford MW.
 Bedford OXA Armoured
 Bedford OXC Semi-trailer
 Bedford OXD GS
 Bedford OYC Tanker
 Bedford OYD GS
 Bedford QLB Bofors.
 Bedford QLD GS.
 Bedford QLR/QLC Radio/communications.
 Bedford QLT Troop carrier.
 Crossley Q-Type.
 GMC DUKW six-wheel-drive amphibious truck
 Guy Ant
 Guy Lizard Armoured Command Vehicle (21)
 Humber FWD.
 Karrier K6.
 Leyland Hippo Mk II.
 Morris C4
 Morris ML Ambulance
 Morris C8 GS
 Morris Commercial CD series.
 Morris Commercial CS8.
 Morris Commercial 8x8 GS Terrapin amphibious truck
 Scammell Pioneer Semi-trailer SV1S and SV2S (~500)

United States

Tanks

Light tanks
 Marmon-Herrington CTLS
 Light Tank M2
 M2A1 (10)
 M2A2 (239)
 M2A3 (72)
 M2A4 (375)
 Light Tank M3/M5 (22,743) ("General Stuart", shortened to "Stuart" and unofficially "Honey" in British service)
 Light Tank M22 (830) ("Locust" in British service, name adopted by America)
 Light Tank M24 (4,731) ("General Chaffee" in British service, name adopted by America)

Medium tanks
 Medium Tank M3 (7,533) (General Lee American tanks purchased by the British under lend-lease.)
 Medium Tank M4 (58,000) (General Sherman bought by British from U.S. under lend lease)
 Medium Tank M2 (112, used for training only)
 Medium Tank M7 -prototype

Heavy tanks
 Heavy Tank M26 Pershing (1,436)
 M6 heavy tank - prototype
 M4A3E2 Sherman "Jumbo" (~290)
 T34 Heavy Tank - prototype
 T29 Heavy Tank - prototype
 T28 Super Heavy Tank a.k.a. 105 mm Gun Motor Carriage T95 (2) - prototype
 T30 Heavy Tank - prototype
 T14 Heavy Tank - prototype
 T32 heavy tank - prototype

Tank destroyers
 M3 Gun Motor Carriage
 M6 Gun Motor Carriage (5,380)
 M10 tank destroyer (6,706)
 M18 Hellcat (2,507)
 M36 tank destroyer (~1,400)
 T25 AT tank destroyer - prototype
 T40/M9 Tank Destroyer - prototype

Self-propelled artillery
 M4 Mortar Carrier 81 mm (572)
 M43 Howitzer Motor Carriage
 M7 Priest 105 mm (3,490) (105mm SP, Priest in British service, Priest name adopted by America)
 M8 Howitzer Motor Carriage 75 mm (1,178) (Scott)
 M12 Gun Motor Carriage 155 mm
 M40 GMC 155 mm
 T18 Howitzer Motor Carriage - prototype
 T82 Howitzer Motor Carriage - prototype
 M21 Mortar Motor Carriage
 T30 Howitzer Motor Carriage
 T34 Calliope
 T40 Whizbang

Self-propelled anti-aircraft guns
 M13 Multiple Gun Motor Carriage
 M16 Multiple Gun Motor Carriage
 M15 Combination Gun Motor Carriage
 M19 Multiple Gun Motor Carriage

Armoured personnel carriers
 M3 Scout Car
 Half-track Personnel Carrier M3 (4,088)

Armoured cars
 M2 Half Track Car (13,500)
 M3 Halftrack (20,918)
 M8 Greyhound (11,667)
 M20 Armored Utility Car (3,680)
 M9 Half Track Car (3,500)
 T17 Armored Car (250)

Artillery tractors
 M4 Tractor
 M5 Tractor
 M39 Armored Utility Vehicle

Amphibious
 Landing Vehicle Tracked (18,620)
 Landing Craft, Vehicle, Personnel (LCVP) or Higgins boat (20,000)
 M29 Weasel
 DUKW (21,147)

Utility vehicles 
 Dodge WC series light trucks
 Harley-Davidson WLA motorcycle
 Willys MB light truck
 GMC CCKW Cargo Truck

Yugoslavia

Tanks

Self-Propelled Guns
 M3 Stuart modified with various captured German weapons

See also 
 List of equipment used in World War II
 List of armoured fighting vehicles of World War II
 List of prototype World War II combat vehicles
 Military equipment of Germany's allies on the Balkan and Russian fronts (1941–45)
 List of U.S. Signal Corps Vehicles
 G-numbers
 Hobarts Funnies

References

Citations

Bibliography
 
 Taki's Imperial Japanese Army Page - Akira Takizawa

External links 
 Canadian Military Vehicles in WW2 at Maple Leaf Up
A complete online collection Manuals for WWII Dodge WC-series 4×4 and 6×6 - by ExpODe.nl and ArmyVehicleMarking.com

Vehicles
World War II